Tod of the Fens is a children's historical novel by Elinor Whitney Field. Set in Boston, England, in the early fifteenth century, it is a light-hearted adventure about Tod, a boy who lives with a band of men outside town, and Prince Hal, the heir to the throne, who disguises himself so he can move among the people incognito. The novel, illustrated by Warwick Goble, was first published in 1928 and was a Newbery Honor recipient in 1929.

A public domain online edition of Tod of the Fens, a 1929 Newbery Honor Book, is available at A Celebration of Women Writers.

References

1928 American novels
Children's historical novels
American children's novels
Newbery Honor-winning works
Novels set in Lincolnshire
Novels set in the 15th century
1928 children's books